Snoghøj is a southern suburb of Fredericia, Denmark (at 55.52°N and 9.72°E), between Erritsø and Middelfart that developed because of the Højskole (folk high school) that was built there. The town has a population of nearly 3,000 people, and an average of 16 snow days and 97 rain days per year. The average temperature is 2 degrees Celsius in the winter, and 14 degrees Celsius in the summer.

From Snoghøj, the 1,178-metre long Little Belt Bridge connects Jutland with Funen over the Little Belt strait.

Cities and towns in the Region of Southern Denmark
Fredericia